The Letter of the Twenty Two was a letter written by twenty two working class members of the Russian Communist Party (Bolshevik) expressing their concerns about the rift which they perceived between workers and party leaders. It was addressed to the Executive Committee of the Communist International and sent on  February 26, 1922. The original twenty two signatories were all metalworkers. However Alexandra Kollontai and Zoya Shadurskaia, both prominent Bolshevik women of noble background, subsequently signed the letter.

Signatories
The signatories of the letter were as follows:

 Mikhail Ivanovich Lobanov (1889–1929) 
 Nikolai Vladimirovich Kuznetsov (1884–1937)
 A. Polosatov
 Aleksandr Nikolaevich Medvedev (1892–1944)
 Gavril Myasnikov
 V. Pleshkov 
 G. Shokhanov 
 Sergei Pavlovich Medvedev
 Genrikh Ivanovich Bruno (1889–1937) (party member since 1906)
 Aleksandr (Iosif) Grigorevich Pravdin (1879–1938) (1899)
 I. Ivanov (1899)
 Flor Anisimovich Mitin  (1882–1937) (1902)
 Pavel Semenovich Borisov (1892–1939) (1913)
 M. Kopylov (1912)
 Zhilin (1915)
 Mikhail Ivanovich Chelyshev (1888–1937) (1910)
 Aleksandr Fedorovich Tolokontsev (1889–1937) (1914)
 Alexander Gavrilovich Shliapnikov (1883–1954) (1901)
 I. Barulin (1917)
 V. Belcrenev (1907-9/1917)
 A. Pavlov (1917)
 A. M. Tashkin (1892–1942) (1917)

See also
Conference of the Twenty Two, the founding Bolshevik conference held near Geneva, Switzerland in 1904

References

External links
 “To Members of the International Conference of the Communist International” - English translation

Bolsheviks
Open letters
1922 in Russia